In mathematics and group theory, the term multiplicative group refers to one of the following concepts:

the group under multiplication of the invertible elements of a field, ring, or other structure for which one of its operations is referred to as multiplication.
the algebraic torus GL(1)..

Examples 
When n is not prime, there are elements other than zero that are not invertible.
 The multiplicative group of positive real numbers  is an abelian group with 1 its identity element. The logarithm is a group isomorphism of this group to the additive group of real numbers, .
 The multiplicative group of a field  is the set of all nonzero elements: , under the multiplication operation. If  is finite of order q (for example q = p a prime, and ), then the multiplicative group is cyclic: .

Group scheme of roots of unity
The group scheme of n-th roots of unity is by definition the kernel of the n-power map on the multiplicative group GL(1), considered as a group scheme. That is, for any integer n > 1 we can consider the morphism on the multiplicative group that takes n-th powers, and take an appropriate fiber product of schemes, with the morphism e that serves as the identity.

The resulting group scheme is written μn (or ). It gives rise to a reduced scheme, when we take it over a field K, if and only if the characteristic of K does not divide n. This makes it a source of some key examples of non-reduced schemes (schemes with nilpotent elements in their structure sheaves); for example μp over a finite field with p elements for any prime number p. 

This phenomenon is not easily expressed in the classical language of algebraic geometry. For example, it turns out to be of major importance in expressing the duality theory of abelian varieties in characteristic p (theory of Pierre Cartier). The Galois cohomology of this group scheme is a way of expressing Kummer theory.

See also 
Multiplicative group of integers modulo n
Additive group

Notes

References 
 Michiel Hazewinkel, Nadiya Gubareni, Nadezhda Mikhaĭlovna Gubareni, Vladimir V. Kirichenko. Algebras, rings and modules. Volume 1. 2004. Springer, 2004. 

Algebraic structures
Group theory
Field (mathematics)